Lobatse Stadium is a multi-use stadium in Lobatse, Botswana.  It is used mostly for football matches and serves as the home stadium of Extension Gunners.  The stadium holds 20,000 people.
There was a progressive construction of stadium in Lobatse which was expected to be done by end of 2010.

External links
Venue information

Football venues in Botswana
Badminton venues
Badminton in Botswana